The 2015 League of Ireland Cup, known for sponsorship reasons as the 2015 EA Sports Cup, was the 42nd season of the League of Ireland's secondary knockout competition. The EA Sports Cup features teams from the SSE Airtricity League Premier and First Divisions, as well as some intermediate level teams.

Teams

Clubs denoted with * received a bye into Second Round

First round
The draw for the First Round took place on 10 February 2015.
 The First Round games were played on 9 and 10 March 2015.

Second round
The draw for the second round took place on 18 March. The draw was regionalised, based on geographical pools.  Ties were played on Monday 6 and Tuesday 7 April.

Quarter finals
The draw for the quarter finals took place on Wednesday 15 April. The draw was an open draw, following on from previous draws made on a regional basis. Ties were played Monday 18 and Tuesday 19 May.

Semi finals
Ties were played Monday 3 August.

Final
The EA Sports Cup Final was played on Saturday 19 September. The match took place at Eamonn Deacy Park, following a coin-toss for home advantage, and was screened live on Setanta Sports. St Patrick's Athletic won the tie on penalties, following a scoreless draw.

References

Cup
3
League of Ireland Cup seasons